The 1936 Northwestern Wildcats football team represented Northwestern University during the 1936 college football season. In their second year under head coach Pappy Waldorf, the Wildcats compiled a 7–1 record (6–0 against Big Ten Conference opponents), won the Big Ten championship, outscored their opponents by a combined total of 132 to 73, and were ranked No. 7 in the final AP Poll. Their only loss came on the last day of the season against Notre Dame.

Schedule

References

Northwestern
Northwestern Wildcats football seasons
Big Ten Conference football champion seasons
Northwestern Wildcats football